Spine of the World may refer to:

 Spine of the World (Forgotten Realms), a mountain range in the Forgotten Realms setting
 The Spine of the World, a novel in the Paths of Darkness series by R. A. Salvatore